Abepalpus  is a genus of flies in the family Tachinidae, containing only the species Abepalpus archytoides.

External links

Tachinidae
Monotypic Diptera genera
Taxa named by Charles Henry Tyler Townsend